Showbiz Police: Una sa Eksena (formerly known as Showbiz Police: Intriga Under Arrest) is a Philippine-based weekly comprehensive entertainment news program and show business-oriented talk show produced by the TV5 Entertainment Group, aired every Saturday at 6:00 pm (18:00) on TV5.

Launched on September 14, 2013, Showbiz Police: Intriga Under Arrest was one of the 8 newly launched weekend programs under the "Weekend Do It Better" block of the network.

It was later moved to a new timeslot on weekdays from January 20, 2014, at 4:00 pm. The show ended on June 6, 2014.

Segments
Insta-grasyon
Direk's Statement
Cornered by Cristy
Trending Alert
Stylish, Style Less
Good, Bad, OMG!
Oh My Gulay
Blind Item
Totoo o Promo
Promptu
Marfori Exclusive
Celebrity Face-Off

Hosts

Main hosts
Raymond Gutierrez
Cristy Fermin
Jose Javier Reyes

Co-hosts
Divine Lee 
MJ Marfori
Shalala

Former hosts
Dani Castaño (September–November 2013)
Lucy Torres-Gomez (September–November 2013)

Awards
Best Showbiz Oriented Talk Show - 12th Gawad Tanglaw Awards

See also
TV5
List of programs broadcast by TV5 (Philippine TV network)
List of Philippine television shows

External links
Showbiz Police Website

References

TV5 (Philippine TV network) original programming
Entertainment news shows in the Philippines
2013 Philippine television series debuts
2014 Philippine television series endings
Philippine television talk shows
Filipino-language television shows